"Blanco" is a song by Colombian singer J Balvin. It was released as the lead single from his studio album Colores on November 15, 2019. On Billboards Hot Latin Songs chart, it peaked at number 18. The song was certified double platinum in Mexico, and platinum in Spain and the United States.

Background and composition 
The track premiered on February 27, 2020, as the first anteroom of the album Colores. The song was written by the singer with Alejandro Ramírez and René Claro, a beat is present in the short-lived song, as well as a catchy lyrics. It was carried out under the production of Sky Rompiendo.

Music video 
The music video for "Blanco" premiered on November 15, 2019, and was directed by Colin Tilley. Takashi Murakami was in charge of art and visuals. In the futuristic audiovisual material the white color predominates.

Commercial performance 
Like the rest of the songs from Colores, it managed to appear on the Billboard Hot Latin Songs chart, peaking at number eighteen. In addition, it was certified platinum in that country. In Mexico, the single appeared at number thirty-four on Billboard's Airplay chart, and got the double platinum record.

Charts

Weekly charts

Year-end charts

Certifications

See also
List of Billboard number-one Latin songs of 2020

References 

2019 songs
2019 singles
J Balvin songs
Songs written by J Balvin
Music videos directed by Colin Tilley
Spanish-language songs